"Shadow Play" is the first segment of the twenty-third episode of the first season (1985–86) of the American television series The Twilight Zone, and is a remake of the original series episode of the same name. The segment first aired on April 4, 1986. It holds closely to the plot of the original episode, in which a man on death row claims that he is having a recurring dream and that when he is executed, ending the dream, all the people in the dream world will be wiped out of existence.

Plot
Adam Grant is tried for first-degree murder, found guilty, and sentenced to death by hanging. He laughs and tells the judge that his execution won't matter because he is only dreaming.

Prosecutor Mark Ritchie and Grant's attorney Erin Jacobs ponder Grant's strange claim. Jacobs argues that Grant must be telling the truth. For evidence, Jacobs asks why there was no press in or around the courtroom despite this being a murder trial.

Ritchie visits Grant's cell and tries to argue that Grant is simply trying for an insanity defense, even though Grant can lip-sync everything Ritchie says. Grant asks Ritchie how, if he is to be executed Monday at 12:01 am, could he have been sentenced less than a day ago, as courts do not operate on Sundays. Grant says that though different people take on each role in each iteration of the dream, Ritchie's wife Carol never changes roles because she is Grant's sister in reality. Grant suspects that he is having this dream because he feels guilty about something which he did to Carol. He is momentarily troubled when he realizes that he can't remember what it is he feels guilty about or what happens after he is hung, but he brushes these concerns aside. Grant tells what Carol told Ritchie earlier that evening, which makes Ritchie panic and leave.

A priest visits Grant in his cell. Grant claims that the priest is actually his own father who died years ago. Meanwhile, Ritchie frantically tries to get a stay of execution. Just as the governor calls the execution chamber, the buttons are pushed. Before Grant can be hanged, he disappears, shortly followed by everyone in this world.

The opening courtroom scene replays with the people in different roles—Jacobs is now the judge, Grant's father is the jury foreman, inmate Flash is the prosecutor, and Jimmy (another inmate) is the defense attorney.

External links
 
 Postcards from the Zone episode 1.56 Shadow Play

1986 American television episodes
The Twilight Zone (1985 TV series season 1) episodes
Television episodes about nightmares
Television shows based on short fiction
Television remakes

fr:Jeux d'ombres (La Cinquième Dimension)